OMHA may refer to:

 Ontario Mental Health Act
Ontario Minor Hockey Association
⟨omha⟩, an Irish tetragraph